The Redmi 7 is an Android-based smartphone as part of the Redmi series, a sub-brand of Xiaomi Inc. It was announced on March 18, 2019 and it was released on March 20, 2019.

References 

Android (operating system) devices
7
Mobile phones with multiple rear cameras
Mobile phones with infrared transmitter
Mobile phones introduced in 2019